James Lyster  was an Anglican Dean in the Nineteenth century.

Lauder was educated at Trinity College, Dublin He was  Dean of Leighlin from 1854 to 1864  when he emigrated to Canada to become Dean of Ontario.

He died at Ruthin on 2 September 1891.

References

1891 deaths
Alumni of Trinity College Dublin
Deans of Leighlin
Deans of Ontario
Year of birth missing